Kamala refers to:

People
 Kamala (name), given name and surname, includes list of people and characters with the name
 Kamala Harris, the 49th and current Vice President of the United States
 Kamala (wrestler) (1950–2020), American professional wrestler
 Kamala II or Uncle Elmer (1939–1992), American professional wrestler

Places
 Kamala Point, a headland, Hawaii, United States
 Kamala River, a river in Nepal and India
 Kamala Beach, a beach in Phuket Province, Thailand
 Kamala, a sub-district of Kathu District, Thailand

Plants
 Nelumbo nucifera or kamala, a lotus
 Mallotus philippensis or kamala, a plant in the spurge family

Other uses
 Kamala (band), a Finnish thrash metal musical band
 Kamala (film), a 2019 Malayalam film
 Kamala or Kamalatmika, a Hindu goddess
 Kamala or Lakshmi, a Hindu goddess
 Amala and Kamala, Indian feral children who were purportedly raised by wolves

See also
 Kamela (disambiguation)
 Komala (disambiguation)
 Kamal (disambiguation)
 Kamla (disambiguation)